Maria Sharapova successfully defended her title, by defeating Patty Schnyder in the final.

Seeds
The top 8 seeds received a bye into the second round.

Draw

Key 
 Q = Qualifier
 WC = Wild card
 LL = Lucky loser
 r = Retired
 w/o = Walkover

Finals

Top half

Section 1

Section 2

Bottom half

Section 3

Section 4

External links
 Official WTA Tour website.

2007 WTA Tour
2007 Singles
2007 US Open Series